Sushchyovo is a rural locality (a village) in Krasnoplamenskoye Rural Settlement, Alexandrovsky District, Vladimir Oblast, Russia. The population was 3 as of 2010. There is 1 street.

Geography 
Sushchyovo is located 31 km northwest of Alexandrov (the district's administrative centre) by road. Mukhanovo is the nearest rural locality.

References 

Rural localities in Alexandrovsky District, Vladimir Oblast